The Woodsmen is a Canadian series of shorts seen on The Comedy Network as a segment on its homegrown variety show Canadian Comedy Shorts. The show is about two hermits named Walt and Claude and their
misadventures in the backwoods of Canada.

Overview

Origins 

The Woodsmen were originally created by Bart Batchelor while working on comic books.  The idea became a student film, that was subsequently bought by The Comedy Network.  
Following graduation, Batchelor teamed up with fellow Emily Carr Institute alumni Chris Nielsen to pitch and produce a further 6 episodes of the series.

Production

The Woodsmen was written and directed by both Bart Batchelor and 
Chris Nielsen. The scripts were subjected to rigorous re-writes and 
improvisational table reads before being committed to animation.  Each episode was approximately 5 
minutes in duration.  The show was produced mainly in a basement suite apartment.

Characters

Walt

Walt is shown to be the 'heavier' of the two with what appears to be a beard, and a blue and white outfit. He's brash and offensive.  His egocentric nature is the driving force of the plot in the show.  He recklessly forces Claude on quests of vanity and self-interest.

Claude

Claude is apparently Canadian, but his accent is ambiguously European.  He wears a red and white outfit, and if typified by his reluctant participation in whatever Walt happens to be doing.  Claude is just as deranged as Walt, killing forest creatures, destroying the environment, but pulls it off with an air of cuteness and charm.

Episodes

The Woodsmen has aired seven times on the Comedy Network so far this season.

Car Alarm
In this episode, Walt and Claude are trying to determine the source of a car alarm.

David Suzuki
This episode centers around a documentary being created by noted Canadian nature conservationist David Suzuki and how Walt and Claude manage to derail the project entirely.

Potato Cult
The lumps of dirt on the forest floor have Walt quite upset. While he and Claude try to remedy the situation, the two have a run-in with the leader of a strange cult who worship potatoes.

The Hole
Walt and Claude find themselves trapped in a hole, and they try to figure out how to escape.  It is in this episode that Walt and Claude come to the conclusion that, "All we ever talk about is...quicksand."

Claudenapped
Claude holds himself hostage in hopes of getting enough money to pay off his student loans.

Claude Is Dead
Claude dies in a tragic hot-dog-and-bee related accident. Walt then has to find a new Claude.

See also
Canadian Comedy Shorts
Comedy Network
Cult television
 The Woodsmen (2015 TV-series) (IMDB) produced by Critical Content and Relativity Television (Genre: Reality TV)

External links

Man-Male's Official Website
The Comedy Network's Homepage
Santa Cruz Soul/Rock Band (the awkward rockers)

Canadian animated short films